Copper(I) t-butoxide is an alkoxide of copper(I). It is a white sublimable solid. It is a reagent in the synthesis of other copper compounds.

The compound was originally obtained by salt metathesis from lithium tert-butoxide and copper(I) chloride. An octameric form was obtained by alcoholysis of mesitylcopper:
8 CuC6H2Me3 + 8 HOBu-t → 8 HC6H2Me3 + [CuOBu-t]8

References

Copper(I) compounds
Tert-butyl compounds
Alkoxides